The Bucharest Metropolitan Circus, also known as Bucharest State Circus, or Globus Circus, is a circus located at 15 Circului Alley in Bucharest, Romania.

Built in 1960-1961 by architects Nicolae Porumbescu, Nicolae Pruncu and Constantin Ruleahe, the circus is listed in the National Register of Historic Monuments in Romania. It has a capacity of up to 1,850 seats.

Notes

External links

 Bucharest Metropolitan Circus - Official Website 

Circuses in Bucharest
Historic monuments in Bucharest
Culture in Bucharest
Buildings and structures in Bucharest 
Tourist attractions in Bucharest
Event venues established in 1961